Neochromis is a genus of haplochromine cichlids endemic to Lake Victoria.  This genus is currently considered a synonym of Haplochromis pending a comprehensive review of the haplochromine cichlids, though if recognized as a valid genus it would contain the following species
 Neochromis gigas Seehausen & Lippitsch, 1998
 Neochromis greenwoodi Seehausen & Bouton, 1998
 Neochromis omnicaeruleus Seehausen & Bouton, 1998
 Neochromis rufocaudalis Seehausen & Bouton, 1998
 Neochromis simotes (Boulenger 1911)

References

Haplochromini
Cichlid genera

Taxa named by Charles Tate Regan
Taxonomy articles created by Polbot